Antonio Carlos Martins de Bulhões (born 5 May 1968) is a Brazilian politician and religious leader. Although born in Rio de Janeiro, he has spent his political career representing São Paulo, having served as state representative since 2007.

Personal life
Bulhões is originally a lawyer, and is also a pastor and bishop of the neo-Pentecostal movement the Universal Church of the Kingdom of God. Bulhões has also been a presenter for the television shows Fala que Eu Te Escuto (Speak I love you) on RecordTV and Retrato de Família (Family Portrait) on Record News.

Political career
Between 7 February 2012 and 1 February 2013, Bulhões was the leader of the Brazilian Republican Party or (PRB) in the legislative house.

Bulhões voted in favor of the impeachment against then-president Dilma Rousseff. Bulhões voted in favor of the Brazil labor reform (2017), and would later back Rousseff's successor Michel Temer against a similar impeachment motion.

References

1968 births
Living people
Politicians from Rio de Janeiro (city)
Brazilian television personalities
Brazilian Pentecostal pastors
Members of the Universal Church of the Kingdom of God
Members of the Chamber of Deputies (Brazil) from São Paulo
Republicans (Brazil) politicians